The 66th Rescue Squadron is stationed at Nellis Air Force Base, Nevada, where it operates HH-60 Pave Hawk aircraft conducting search and rescue and combat search and rescue missions.  It is geographically separated unit of the 563rd Rescue Group at Davis-Monthan Air Force Base, Arizona, which is part of the 23d Wing at Moody Air Force Base, Georgia.

Mission
The primary mission of the 66th Rescue Squadron is worldwide combat rescue in support of combat air forces. The 66 RQS is one of six Air Force active-duty HH-60 combat rescue units and is geared for worldwide deployment.

The squadron performs other vital functions in addition to worldwide combat rescue. The unit's secondary mission is to provide rescue support for air operations over the Nellis Range Complex and backup rescue for civilian agencies in the local area and the greater Southwestern United States.

Depending on the mission, a typical rescue crew may include a pilot, co-pilot, flight engineer, aerial gunner and two pararescuemen. These Pararescue Jumpers, or "PJs," are qualified as combat paramedics, scuba divers, parachutists, mountain climbers and survivalists.

The unit provides rapidly deployable combat search and rescue (CSAR) forces to theater CINCs worldwide and conducts peacetime search and rescue in support of the National Search and Rescue Plan and the U.S. Air Force Warfare Center.

The 66th also directly supports HH-60G logistical and maintenance support requirements for the U.S. Air Force Weapons School and Air Combat Command-directed operational test missions.

The first Sikorsky HH-60W Jolly Green II arrived during September 2022 beginning the replacement of the HH-60G.

History

The 66th flew search and rescue, aeromedical evacuation, and disaster relief from 1952 to 1958 and since 1991.  The squadron deployed to Southwest Asia to ensure Iraq’s compliance with United Nations treaty terms from, January–July 1993.

The squadron has been plagued by aviation accidents in recent years. Twelve USAF Airmen were killed when two HH-60G Pavehawk helicopters, call signs Jolly 38 and Jolly 39,  were involved in a mid-air collision on 3 September 1998 over the Nevada Test and Training Range during a routine night training exercise.  An investigation of the crash cited inadequate training, and constant combat deployments without adequate rest, as contributing factors.

The unit was in Afghanistan in the summer of 2010. Media reported four aircrew deaths in June when a Pave Hawk helicopter was shot down during a rescue mission on 9 June. Flight engineer David Smith was lost on impact. On 2 July a fifth death was added to the list of four when Captain David Wisniewski died from injuries received in the 9 June crash. Captain Wisniewski is credited with saving more than 240 soldiers during his seven tours of duty in Iraq and Afghanistan, 40 of which were saved in his final rescue mission in June. The only two survivors Captain Anthony Simone and Master Sergeant Christopher Aguilera are still in recovery as of 25 September 2010.

Operations

Lineage
 Constituted as the 66th Air Rescue Squadron on 17 October 1952
 Activated on 14 November 1952
 Inactivated on 18 January 1958
 Activated on 1 January 1991
 Redesignated 66th Rescue Squadron on 1 February 1993

Assignments
 9th Air Rescue Group, 14 November 1952 – 18 January 1958 (attached to United States Air Forces in Europe until 15 November 1953, Third Air Force until 1 August 1954, United States Air Forces in Europe until c. 18 January 1958)
Air Rescue Service, 18 January 1991 (attached to 4404th Operations Group (Provisional) 25 January - 5 July 1993)
57th Operations Group, 1 February 1993
563d Rescue Group, 1 October 2003

Stations
RAF Manston, England, 14 November 1952 – 18 January 1958
Nellis Air Force Base, Nevada, 18 January 1991 – present (deployed to Kuwait City, Kuwait 25 January - 5 July 1993)

Aircraft

 Grumman SA-16 Albatross (1952–1958)
 Sikorsky SH-19 (1952–1958)
 Fairchild C-82 Packet (1952–1953)
 Sikorsky HH-60G Pave Hawk (1991 – present)
 Sikorsky HH-60W Jolly Green II (2022 - present)

References

Military units and formations in Nevada
066
1952 establishments in England